Jo Eun-sim (born December 26, 1986), better known by her stage name, Song Ga-in, is a South Korean female trot singer. She is the winner of the 2019 reality television show Miss Trot. She often appears on KBS's Golden Oldies.

Early life and education 
Song was born Jo Eun-shim on December 26, 1986, in Jindo County, South Jeolla Province, South Korea. Her mother, Song Sun-dan, teaches Jindo ssitgimgut, a shaman exorcism ritual that is classified as one of South Korea's "Intangible Cultural Properties." Her older brother, Jo Seong-jae, is a member of the traditional Korean music group Baraji.

Song began singing traditional pansori when she was in middle school and later attended Gwangju Arts High School. She majored in traditional Korean music at Chung-Ang University.

Discography

Studio albums

Live albums

Compilation albums

Singles

Soundtrack appearances

Compilation appearances

Filmography

Film

Television Series

Television

Web shows

Ambassadorship 
Ambassador of Public Relations for the Korean Cultural Heritage Foundation (2022)
 Hanbok ambassador (2022)
 2022 Incheon International Airport Honorary Gatekeeper (2022)

Awards and nominations

Listicles

Notes

References 

1986 births
Living people
Trot singers
MBK Entertainment artists
21st-century South Korean women singers
South Korean broadcasters
South Korean women television presenters
Chung-Ang University alumni